PMDTT is an antiviral phosphonate nucleoside.

References

Antiviral drugs
Pyrimidinediones
Phosphonic acids
Tetrahydrofurans